Stephen James (born 2 May 1961) is an English retired professional snooker player.

Career
A former postman, the high point of his career was his sole ranking title – the Classic in 1990, beating Australian Warren King 10–6 in the final. His world ranking peaked at number seven the following season, the best of his five seasons in the top sixteen.

On 14 April 1990, in his match against Alex Higgins at the World Snooker Championship in Sheffield, James became the first player to produce a 16-red total clearance in competitive play. In other words, he potted 16 reds and 16 colours consecutively, followed by all the coloured balls in order: a situation that was only possible because he was awarded a free ball before any red had been potted.

A year later he reached the semi-finals of the World Snooker Championship, beating defending champion Stephen Hendry in the quarter-finals (it was six years before anyone else beat Hendry in the tournament: Ken Doherty in 1997). He was beaten in the semi-final by Jimmy White, with whom he shares his birthday; coincidentally, the match began on their birthday, 2 May.

James became wealthy through snooker, but was banned from driving in 1996, and in 1998 declared himself bankrupt after spending £700,000 on "fast living", even having to sell his practice table. His financial problems saw him turn to drinking heavily. A diabetic, James missed the British Open in 2004 due to a kidney infection.

He was the first player ever to score two centuries on his Crucible debut, including a 140, the second highest by a debutant of all time. In addition to 1991, he reached the quarter-finals on his debut in 1988, and the last 16 on three further occasions.

Performance and rankings timeline

Career finals

Ranking finals: 1 (1 title)

Non-ranking finals: 3 (1 title)

Pro-am finals: 3 (1 title)

References

1961 births
Living people
English snooker players
People from Cannock